The Freedom Sessions is an album by Sarah McLachlan which was released on 6 December 1994 on Nettwerk in Canada and on 28 March 1995 on Arista Records in the United States. The album consisted primarily of previously unreleased alternative versions and remixes of McLachlan recordings, plus a cover version of "Ol' '55" by Tom Waits. Many of the tracks were recorded during the same sessions as McLachlan's 1993 album Fumbling Towards Ecstasy. In subsequent live performances, some of these songs (most notably "Ice Cream" and "Hold On") were reworked to match the style in which they were played on this album.

The album was released in two versions: a standard CD, and an enhanced CD containing CD-ROM bonus material including interviews and music videos. The album was one of the first major enhanced CD releases, and sold more than 200,000 units.

Track listing
All songs by McLachlan, unless otherwise noted.

CD: Standard release 

 "Elsewhere" – 4:33
 "Plenty" – 3:20
 "Mary" – 3:55
 "Good Enough" – 3:20
 "Hold On" – 6:43
 "Ice Cream" – 2:30
 "Ice" – 3:58
 "Ol' '55" (Tom Waits) – 4:12

CD: Nettwerk / W2-36321 (Canada) 

 Data Track
 "Elsewhere" – 4:33
 "Plenty" – 3:20
 "Mary" – 3:55
 "Good Enough" – 3:20
 "Hold On" – 6:43
 "Ice Cream" – 2:30
 "Ice" – 3:58
 "Ol' '55" (Tom Waits) – 9:33

 Enhanced v2.0 release
 "Ol' '55" is followed by a second version of "Hold On" 4:52 which starts at 4:41

Personnel
Sarah McLachlan - Vocals, Acoustic & Electric Guitars, Piano, Keyboards
Luke Doucet - Slide Acoustic Guitar
David Sinclair - Acoustic Guitar
Pierre Marchand - Bass, Orchestra, Drum Programming, Percussion, Background Vocals
Brian Minato - Bass
David Kershaw - Bass, Piano, Hammond Organ
Camille Henderson - Background Vocals
Ashwin Sood - Drums, Djembe'

Charts

Certifications and sales

References

Demo albums
1994 remix albums
Nettwerk Records remix albums
Arista Records remix albums
Sarah McLachlan remix albums
Albums produced by Pierre Marchand